Botyodes asialis is a species of moth of the family Crambidae described by Achille Guenée in 1854. It is known from Africa, through Asia to the Pacific, including Fiji, Hong Kong, Réunion, Thailand, India, Siam, Sri Lanka, the Philippines, New Guinea, Samoa, Malay Peninsula and Queensland.

The larvae have been recorded feeding on Populus species.

References

External links
 Species feeding on Populus alba
 Lepidoptera of American Samoa with particular reference to biology and ecology

Spilomelinae
Moths of Africa
Moths of Fiji
Moths of Japan
Moths of Madagascar
Moths of Réunion
Moths described in 1854